The Sustainable Water Programme of Action was established in 2003 to address concerns about fresh water in New Zealand.

See also
Water in New Zealand
Agriculture in New Zealand

References

External links
Sustainable Water Programme of Action page at the Ministry for the Environment

Environmental policy in New Zealand
Water in New Zealand
2003 establishments in New Zealand
2008 disestablishments in New Zealand